Roelof Hommema (3 October 1904 – 27 August 1956) was a Dutch rower. He competed at the 1924 Summer Olympics in Paris with the men's eight where they were eliminated in round one.

References

1904 births
1956 deaths
Dutch male rowers
Olympic rowers of the Netherlands
Rowers at the 1924 Summer Olympics
Sportspeople from Leeuwarden
European Rowing Championships medalists
20th-century Dutch people